The Carrizo Plain (Obispeño: tšɨłkukunɨtš, "Place of the rabbits") is a large enclosed grassland plain, approximately  long and up to  across, in southeastern San Luis Obispo County, California, about  northwest of Los Angeles.  It contains the  Carrizo Plain National Monument, and it is the largest single native grassland remaining in California.  It includes Painted Rock in the Carrizo Plain Rock Art Discontiguous District, which is listed on the National Register of Historic Places. In 2012 it was further designated a National Historic Landmark due to its archeological value. The San Andreas Fault occurs along the eastern edge of the Carrizo Plain at the western base of the Temblor Range.

Geography and geology

The Carrizo Plain extends northwest from the town of Maricopa, following the San Andreas Fault. Bordering the plain to the northeast is the Temblor Range, on the other side of which is California's Central Valley. Bordering the plain to the southwest is the Caliente Range. The community of California Valley is in the northern part of the plain. Soda Lake, a  alkaline lake, is in the center of the plain with the popular Painted Rock containing Chumash and Yokuts rock art nearby. As the central depression in an enclosed basin, Soda Lake receives all of the runoff from both sides of the plain. At , Caliente Mountain, southwest of the plain, stands as the highest point in San Luis Obispo County. The climate type of the Carrizo Plain is semi-arid grassland.

The Carrizo Plain is an easily accessible place to see surface fractures of the San Andreas Fault; they are clearly visible along the eastern side of the plain, at the foot of the Temblor Range. They are best seen in early morning and evening light, when shadows enhance the topography. In addition to its spring wildflower displays, Carrizo Plain is also famous for Painted Rock, a sandstone alcove adorned with pictographs created by the Chumash people around 2000 BC.

Wallace Creek

Wallace Creek is a small stream, draining into Soda Lake, that remains dry most of the year.  It drains perpendicular to the San Andreas Fault, and the creek bed is currently offset by  due to the movement of the fault.  About  of the displacement was created during the 1857 Fort Tejon earthquake. The current segment began forming 3,700 years ago.  Sometime between 1540 and 1630 A.D., the creek was offset by about  feet in an even larger earthquake.

The first creek bed was created around 13,000 years ago when climate change formed the creek on a large active alluvial fan. The second bed was created about 11,000 years ago.

The creek has been carefully studied by geologists to find a correlation between the offset and historical events, such as earthquakes, that have occurred along the San Andreas Fault.  Although Wallace Creek is not the only creek that has been offset by the San Andreas Fault, it is the most spectacular.

Access

State Route 166 passes the south entrance to the Carrizo Plain, and State Route 58 crosses through the northern portion.  Connecting them is the narrow Soda Lake Road, the only dependably passable road through the plain—but even this may become impassable during or soon after a rain since the middle portion of it is gravel.

Geology

San Andreas Fault
The most prominent geologic feature of the Carrizo Plain is the San Andreas Fault, which runs along the northeast side of the plain, at the base of the Elkhorn Scarp. The section of the fault in the Carrizo Plain is the oldest section along the entire fault zone. Displacement on the San Andreas is responsible for the development of distinctive features, including shutter ridges, diverted or decapitated stream channels, and sag ponds. One feature relating to the San Andreas Fault and aligned to it in the Carrizo Plain is the Dragon's Back pressure ridge.

Other faults
The Big Spring Fault, the San Juan Fault, the Morales Fault, and the White Rock Fault are small faults that run parallel to the San Andreas Fault along the Caliente Range on the western boundary of the Carrizo Plain.

Soil taxonomy

The parent materials for soils in the Carrizo Plain are predominantly alluvium deposits. Alluvium is soil that has been deposited by rivers or flowing water. The Paso Robles formation is a well known aquifer that has been reliably productive for ground wells throughout the area. The upper layers of soil are more recent alluvium. This recent layer is thickest near Soda Lake and thins out towards the mountains to the east and west. Throughout the valley the soil composition varies greatly and includes clay loams, silty clay loams, loams, sandy loams, and gravelly loams. The sandier soils tend to reside near the slopes of the valley and provide greater drainage while the soils with more clay are located on the valley floor near Soda Lake, and have much poorer drainage. The soils in the Carrizo Plain have very low fertility because of their high alkalinity content and low rainfall due to the semi-arid climate.

Fauna

The Carrizo Plain is home to 13 species listed as endangered either by the state or federal government, the largest concentration of endangered species in California. Some of these species include the San Joaquin kit fox, the San Joaquin antelope squirrel, the blunt-nosed leopard lizard, the giant kangaroo rat, greater and lesser sandhill cranes, and the California condor.  The tule elk, pronghorn, black-tailed jackrabbit, western coyotes, and Le Conte's thrasher all also make their homes in the Carrizo Plain.  The hotter climate and ecology of Carrizo Plain allows the Le Conte's thrasher of the Southwestern United States to have a small disjunct range farther north than normal.
 San Joaquin kit fox – a small nocturnal subspecies of the kit fox that was formerly common throughout the San Joaquin Valley but has recently become endangered.
 Blunt-nosed leopard lizard – a small, 3–5 inch gray to brown lizard with large dark spots and cream-colored cross bands. It has a broad, triangular shaped head and is endemic to California. It inhabits the grasslands and alkali flats of the San Joaquin Valley and the surrounding foothills and valleys.
Giant kangaroo rat – the largest of all kangaroo rats.  The giant kangaroo rat is also endemic to California and now only occupies about 2% of its original range, making it critically endangered.
San Joaquin antelope squirrel – a light tan squirrel with a white belly and a white stripe down its back and sides.  Most of its habitat is used for agriculture, making the Carrizo Plain the habitat for most of the remaining population.

Carrizo Plain National Monument

Management—historical overview

In 1988, U.S. Bureau of Land Management (BLM), the California Department of Fish and Game (DFG), and the Nature Conservancy (TNC) partnered together to purchase an  parcel of Carrizo Plain land. This joint effort ensured the protection of the plain. Then in 1996, the Carrizo Plain Management Partners again created a joint initiative called the Carrizo Plain Natural Area (CPNA) Plan. The goal of this plan was to:
 Establish long-term mission and vision statements that reflect the long-term objectives of the CPNA,
 Outline objectives and goals for the life of this plan that will help to achieve the mission,
 Consolidate a descriptive inventory of area resources and outline appropriate public uses of those resources,
 Provide an overview of operations, maintenance and personnel needs to assist in developing annual work plans and budgeting for implementation of plan goals.

On January 12, 2001, President Bill Clinton signed a presidential proclamation establishing the Carrizo Plain as a national monument. The first manager of the new Carrizo Plain National Monument was Marlene Braun (1958–2005); she was succeeded by Johna Hurl. The managerial partners of the CPNA took the responsibility of maintaining this new national monument.

Carrizo Plain Natural Area Plan

Mission statement
"Manage the Carrizo Plain Natural Area (CPNA) so that indigenous species interact within a dynamic and fully functioning system in perpetuity while conserving unique natural and cultural resources and maintaining opportunities for compatible scientific research, cultural, social and recreational activities."

Administration
Routine monthly meetings and coordinated planning are essential parts in the management of the CPNA. The administration partners of the CPNA work together to make decisions about the area and what needs to be taken care of in order to maintain the natural environment of the plain. Although each partner has its own headquarters and administrative personnel, the Education Center Coordinator is one position that is funded by all of the CPNA partners. At BLM the staff consists of a project manager, a biological technician, a heavy equipment operator, a computer specialist, and a law enforcement ranger. All TNC personnel are located at their office in San Francisco. DFG at the moment has only one Wildlife Biologist at CPNA along with a Wildlife Assistant II and a Scientific Aide. Outside specialists also volunteer their time to study the area, from plant ecologists to species specialists. The fire suppression administration is the responsibility of BLM, which has formal agreements with Kern, Santa Barbara, and San Luis Obispo counties to help share in the support and funding of its fire suppression program. Funding for other programs within Carrizo Plain National Monument come from its management partners.

Research

When the CPNA Plan was implemented in the late 1990s, one of its first assignments was to gather information on the area's biological, cultural, recreational, and physical resources. The information obtained by the management partners has helped to ensure that each decision made on behalf of the Carrizo Plain National Monument will benefit all of its resources. This research has also helped to manage different activities and events within the plain. For example, plant community restoration seems to be one tool that could benefit the entire region by promoting native species diversity, re-establishing natural biological processes, and protecting endangered species habitats.

Current management projects
One of the current range management projects involves removing non-native grasses by selective cattle grazing early in the season when non-native grasses emerge. Later in the season, the management team removes the cattle, giving native plants a competitive advantage versus the non-native vegetation. The use of grazing on the Carrizo Plain National Monument remains a controversial practice.

Future management projects
The CPNA management partners have allowed a few companies to drill in the area for new oil wells. The wells at the Russell Ranch Oil Field and Morales Canyon Oil Field, on the other side of the Caliente Range, have been unsuccessful for the past 10 years. However, experts believe that "a single potential new field with reserves between 2 and 5 million barrels of oil could be developed with 25 to 30 wells" as estimated by Caliente Resource Management Plan.

There are also an abundant amount of minerals in the Carrizo Plain National Monument. Gypsum, a white mineral used in plasters and wallboards, is a plentiful resource in the plain found in shallow, low-grade areas. In addition, there are detectable amounts of uranium and phosphates. All of these minerals are of low-grade quality, making them unprofitable to reclaim and manufacture.

Camping

Campgrounds
Camping within Carrizo Plain National Monument is available at two primitive campgrounds – KCL Campground and Selby Campground.  These two sites differ markedly.

KCL is located in the southern part of the monument, west and very close to Soda Lake Road.  Access from the main road is easy, and the camping area is generally bounded by a wooden fence.  The campground has eight picnic tables and firepits, and is frequently occupied by "day use" visitors, although overnight camping is also allowed. Trees about the campground provide shade – some of the only shade in the monument's valley.  As this site was previously owned by the Kern County Land Company, there are several outbuildings in a non-maintained state.  The corrals may be used by visitors to stable their horses.

Selby is located more to the north and more distant from Soda Lake Road.  A good gravel road leads to the campground from Soda Lake Road over a distance of five miles.  The road is generally usable in all weather conditions, but does wind and have some moderate grades as it approaches the campground area.  This site is much more rugged, located on a man-made cut into the natural terrain, bounded by hills and canyons.  Camp tables are covered by shade structures, a permanent and toilet outhouse is available (no water), camping is allowed anywhere upon the large flat areas.  Hiking up and into the adjoining Wilderness Study Area provides hearty exercise and impressive views.  The nearby Selby Rocks formation offers a view of large granite boulders.  (It is not advised to climb the rocks as the loose granite surface is fragile.)  A recent addition is a water spigot that provides non-potable water to the campsites.

Primitive camping
Car camping is also an option within certain areas within the monument, primarily in the foothills.  Camping is not allowed in the main valley floor.  See the CPNM Visitor Resource Map.

Conservation management issues

World Heritage Site

The Wilderness Society considered the Carrizo Plain as a nominee for World Heritage Site status.  Only two other locations in California – Redwood National Park and Yosemite National Park – have received this status.  This idea was greatly opposed by The Independent Petroleum Association and the residents of the nearby city of Taft, while supporters of the nomination included the City of San Luis Obispo, the San Luis Obispo Chamber of Commerce, and the San Luis Obispo Chapter of the League of Women Voters.

Advantages of World Heritage Site status for the Carrizo Plain might have included increased tourism for the plain and for surrounding areas, as well as increased ability to attract private and public funding for habitat conservation, sustainable tourism, and increased management support.  However, opponents of the nomination were concerned that World Heritage Site status would create problems for oil production, grazing rights, off-road recreation, and private property rights.  One point of controversy was a buffer zone around the monument; opponents expected this would adversely affect nearby oil drilling sites.  Some local residents were also fearful of the international organizations that would monitor and report on the monument's adherence to World Heritage treaty obligations, because maintenance of World Heritage status would depend on compliance with the 1972 Convention Concerning the Protection of World Cultural and Natural Heritage, ratified by the United States.  The idea was widespread that the United States would lose sovereignty over the area.

The Wilderness Society eventually decided not to nominate the Carrizo Plain National Monument as a World Heritage Site, as nominations are successful only if they have almost unanimous support.

Oil drilling

While the Carrizo Plain is dotted with dry holes drilled and abandoned by oil companies in decades past, no commercially viable quantities of petroleum have ever been found on the plain itself.  Small quantities of drillable oil have been found south of the Caliente Range, near the Russell Ranch Oil Field, and in the northeast part of the Temblors, abutting the giant McKittrick and Cymric fields.  As the plain is adjacent to the super-giant oil fields of Kern County – the Midway-Sunset Oil Field, third largest in the United States, is on the other side of the Temblor Range – the Carrizo Plain has long been considered to have at least a moderate potential for oil development. However, as it is separated from the major oil fields by the San Andreas Fault, and the underlying source rock, the Monterey Formation appears not to have been buried at the right conditions of temperature and pressure, and as the stratigraphy has not favored petroleum entrapment, accumulations of oil in economically recoverable quantities have not been found.  Currently, Vintage Production, a subsidiary of Occidental Petroleum, owns the mineral rights to 30,000 of the monument's .  When oil prices spiked in 2007, Vintage notified the U.S. Bureau of Land Management of its intentions to find out if oil is contained in the Carrizo Plain. The mineral rights owned by Vintage pre-exist the monument's creation by President Bill Clinton in 2001.

Solar power 

The remote Carrizo Plain's status as one of the sunniest places in the state was exploited by the solar power industry from 1983 to 1994. This was by far the largest photovoltaic array in the world, with 100,000 of the  photovoltaic arrays producing 5.2 megawatts at its peak.  The plant was originally constructed by the Atlantic Richfield oil company (ARCO) in 1983. During the 1979 energy crisis ARCO became a solar energy pioneer, manufacturing the photovoltaic arrays themselves. ARCO first built a 1 megawatt pilot operation, the Lugo plant in Hesperia, California, which is also now closed. The Carrizo Solar Corporation, based in Albuquerque, New Mexico, bought the two facilities from ARCO in 1990, but the price of oil never rose as was predicted, so the solar plant never became competitive with fossil fuel-based energy production. Carrizo Solar sold its electricity to the local utility for between three and four cents a kilowatt-hour, while a minimum price of eight to ten cents a kilowatt-hour would have been necessary in order for Carrizo to make a profit. Another photovoltaic facility was planned for the site by the Chatsworth Utility Power Group; with an output of 100 megawatts, it would have been many times larger than the existing facility, but the facility never got off the drawing board. The Carrizo Solar Company dismantled its  facility in the late 1990s, and the used solar panels are still being resold throughout the world.

In October 2007, the Palo Alto company Ausra, doing business as Carrizo Energy, filed an application for a 177 MW (peak) Carrizo Energy Solar Farm (CESF) on  adjacent to the previous ARCO site. Instead of photovoltaic cells (as used by ARCO), however, Ausra will use Fresnel reflectors that concentrate solar energy onto pipes in a receiver elevated above the ground. The concentrated solar energy boils water within a row of specially coated stainless steel pipes in an insulated cavity to produce saturated steam. The steam produced in the receivers is collected in a series of pipes, routed to steam drums, and then to the two turbine generators. Steam used by the steam turbines is condensed into liquid water and then returned to the solar field. Electricity from the steam generators will be used in San Luis Obispo county. Local opposition to some solar farm proposals centers on concerns about height above grade, noise and heat plume.

The solar field would have operated daily from sunrise to sunset. Typical operating hours for the CESF would have been approximately 13 hours per day, or an average of 4,765 hours per year.   In November 2009, the project was canceled.

On August 14, 2008, Pacific Gas and Electric Company announced agreements to buy the power from two proposed photovoltaic plants in the Carrizo Plain, Topaz Solar Farm and High Plains Ranch, with a combined peak power of 800 MW. If built, these will be the largest photovoltaic plants in the world.

As of November 2014 Topaz Solar Farm is operational, with peak power of 550 MW.

California Valley Solar Ranch opened in 2013.

Grazing

Few issues regarding the CPNM have been as controversial as grazing.  The internal dispute in the Bureau of Land Management created national headlines when Marlene Braun, the first Monument Manager of the CPNM, died by suicide in 2005. An investigative article by Los Angeles Times reporters Julie Cart and Maria LaGanga revealed that Braun discussed grazing extensively in correspondence just before her death. The proclamation for the Carrizo Plain National Monument addressed grazing, but its language is similar to that found in most similar proclamations. The proclamation directed BLM to manage grazing in accordance with existing laws and regulations. Braun chose to allow Taylor Grazing Act allotments to expire and replaced them with free use permits. This action was opposed both by many ranchers and Braun's field office supervisor, Ron Huntsinger. Her practice, which would allow BLM to set stocking rates each season as opposed to guaranteeing stocking rates for ten-year periods, was contrary to the desires of the Department of the Interior under President George W. Bush. Bakersfield District Office Manager Ron Huntsinger was brought in to oversee a continuation of the Taylor Grazing Act permit system. Braun and Huntsinger clashed repeatedly and Braun faced the prospect of stiff penalties for insubordination at the time of her death. The LA Times, in a follow-up article by Julie Cart, said, "What began as a policy dispute – to graze or not to graze livestock on the fragile Carrizo grasslands – became a morass of environmental politics and office feuding that Braun was convinced threatened both her future and the landscape she loved." The monument manager's suicide brought "into stark focus the difficulty BLM managers had in trying to balance the demands of providing protection in accordance with the proclamations and balancing the multiple use mandate of FLPMA."

See also
List of national monuments of the United States
List of National Historic Landmarks in California
National Register of Historic Places listings in San Luis Obispo County, California

References

External links

 
 Carrizo.org: The Friends of the Carrizo Plain
USGS: Carrizo Plain National Monument – 3D photographic tour featuring regional geology.
 The Nature Conservancy: Carrizo Plain
 April 16, 2009 The Santa Barbara Independent — story on the Carrizo Plain
 Despite being located less than 130 miles from downtown Los Angeles, few Americans have heard of Carrizo Plain – BBC
 Suicide Casts a Shadow on Conservation Battle – Los Angeles Times

Valleys of California
Grasslands of California
Plains of the United States
Valleys of San Luis Obispo County, California
Valleys of Kern County, California
National Monuments in California
National Historic Landmarks in California
National Register of Historic Places in San Luis Obispo County, California
Natural history of San Luis Obispo County, California
Protected areas of Kern County, California
Protected areas of San Luis Obispo County, California
California Coast Ranges
Temblor Range
Protected areas established in 2001
2001 establishments in California
Campgrounds in California
Geology of California
Bureau of Land Management areas in California
Units of the National Landscape Conservation System
Historic districts on the National Register of Historic Places in California